Rosalind Theresa Cash (December 31, 1938October 31, 1995) was an American actress. Her best-known film role is in the 1971 science-fiction film The Omega Man. Cash also had another notable role as Mary Mae Ward in ABC's General Hospital, a role she portrayed from 1994 until her death in 1995.

Biography

Early life and education
Cash was the second of four children born in Atlantic City, New Jersey, to John O. Cash Sr., a clerk, and Martha Elizabeth Cash. Her siblings were John Jr., Robert, and Helen. Cash graduated with honors from Atlantic City High School in 1956. After high school, Cash attended City College of New York. Her career extended to theater, television, film, and recording.

Career
Cash appeared in the 1962 revival of Fiorello! and was an original member of the Negro Ensemble Company, founded in 1968. In 1973, Cash played the role of Goneril in King Lear at the New York Shakespeare Festival alongside James Earl Jones's Lear. Cash appeared on the New York-area television show Callback!, which featured musical director Barry Manilow. The episode Cash on which was featured was filmed on March 31, 1969, at the Village Gate in New York City. The episode aired on Saturday, April 19, 1969 at 3:30 pm on CBS. Cash performed "God Bless the Child" on the show. No recordings of the performance are known to exist. Her other television credits include The Cosby Show, What's Happening!!, A Different World, Good Times, The Mary Tyler Moore Show, Frank's Place, Kojak, Barney Miller, Benson, Roc, Police Woman, Family Ties, Head of the Class, The Golden Girls, and L.A. Law.

Cash was nominated for an Emmy Award for her work on the Public Broadcasting Service production of Go Tell It on the Mountain. In 1996, she was posthumously nominated for an Emmy Award, Outstanding Supporting Actress in a Drama Series, for her role on General Hospital. Cash's films included Omega Man (1971), Klute (1971), The New Centurions (1972) with George C. Scott, Uptown Saturday Night (1974) with Bill Cosby and Sidney Poitier, and Wrong Is Right (1982). In 1995, she appeared in Tales from the Hood, her last film appearance.

Cash supplied the voices of Sesame Street Muppet Roosevelt Franklin's mother and his sister, Mary Frances, on the 1970 record album The Year of Roosevelt Franklin, Gordon's Friend from Sesame Street alongside Matt Robinson's voices for Roosevelt and his brother, Baby Ray, and friend, A.B. Cito.

Personal life and death
Cash never married nor had children. She died from cancer on October 31, 1995, at Cedars-Sinai Medical Center in Los Angeles, California, aged 56.

Filmography

 The Hustler (1961) .... Waitress 1:45:44 Uncredited
 Klute (1971) .... Pat
 The Omega Man (1971) .... Lisa
 The New Centurions (1972, a.k.a. Precinct 45: Los Angeles Police) .... Lorrie
 Melinda (1972) .... Terry Davis
 Hickey & Boggs (1972) .... Nyona
 The All-American Boy (1973) .... Poppy
 King Lear (1974, TV Series) .... Goneril
 Uptown Saturday Night (1974) .... Sarah Jackson
 Amazing Grace .... Creola Waters
 Ceremonies in Dark Old Men (1975, TV Movie) .... Adele
 Cornbread, Earl and Me (1975, a.k.a. Hit the Open Man) .... Sarah Robinson
 Dr. Black, Mr. Hyde (1976, a.k.a. Dr. Black and Mr. Hyde; Dr. Black and Mr. White; The Watts Monster) .... Dr. Billie Worth
 The Monkey Hu$tle (1976) .... Mama
 The Mary Tyler Moore Show (TV, Episode: "A Girl Like Mary", broadcast December 14, 1974) ... Enid Berringer
 Good Times (1976, TV Series) .... Jessica Bishop
 What's Happening!! (1976–1977, TV Series) .... Loretta
 A Killing Affair (1977, TV Movie, a.k.a. Behind the Badge) .... Beverly York
 The Class of Miss MacMichael (1978) .... Una Ferrar
 Death Drug (1978) .... Doctor
 Barney Miller (1978) .... episode: Dog Days, S5/Ep4, as Carol Slade
 Flashpoint (1979, TV Movie)
 Guyana Tragedy: The Story of Jim Jones (1980, TV Movie, a.k.a. The Mad Messiah) .... Jenny Hammond 
 Benson 1981, season 3 episode 7 "rainbow's end" as Elizabeth
 The Sophisticated Gents (1981, TV Series) .... Christine Jackson
 Keeping On (1981, TV Movie)
 Wrong Is Right (1982, a.k.a. The Man with the Deadly Lens) .... Mrs. Ford
 Sister, Sister (1982, TV Movie) .... Freida Lovejoy-Burton
 Special Bulletin (1983, TV Movie) .... Frieda Barton
 This Is the Life (1983, TV Series) .... Herself
 Just an Overnight Guest (1983, TV Short)
 The Adventures of Buckaroo Banzai Across the 8th Dimension (1984) .... John Emdall 
 Knight Rider (1984, TV Series) .... Irana (Princess) 
 Go Tell It on the Mountain (1985, TV Movie) .... Florence
 The Cosby Show (1986, Episode: "Denise Gets a D") ... Dr. Hughes
 Mighty Pawns (1987, TV Movie) .... Mrs. Robinson
 From a Whisper to a Scream  (1987) .... Snake Woman
 Highway to Heaven (broadcast January 21, 1987, Episode: "A Song of Songs") .... Ellie Livingston
 The Golden Girls (broadcast March 19, 1988, Episode: "Mixed Blessings") .... Lorraine
 Forced March (1989)
 Death Spa (1988, a.k.a. Witch Bitch) .... Sgt. Stone
 Family Ties (1989, TV Series – two-part episode "All in the Neighborhood", broadcast March 12 and 19, 1989) ... Maya Thompson
 A Different World (1989, TV Series, Episode: Under One Roof) .... Dean Hughes
 You Must Remember This (1992, TV Movie, a.k.a. Wonderworks: You Must Remember This, USA: series title) .... Janet Mickens
 The Second Coming (1992, Short)
 The Fresh Prince of Bel-Air (1993, TV Series) .... Mrs. Bassin
 General Hospital (1994–1995, TV Series) .... Mary Mae Ward
 A Dangerous Affair (1995, TV Movie) .... Dr. Robertson
 Tales from the Hood (1995) .... Dr. Cushing
 Circle of Pain (1996, TV Movie) .... (final film role)

References

External links

Obituary at soapzone.com
Obituary at The New York Times  "Rosalind Cash, 56, at Home on Stage and Screen."

1938 births
1995 deaths
Musicians from Atlantic City, New Jersey
African-American actresses
American television actresses
American film actresses
American stage actresses
Atlantic City High School alumni
20th-century American actresses
Deaths from cancer in California
20th-century African-American women
20th-century African-American people